TG&Y was a five and dime, or chain of variety stores and larger discount stores in the United States. At its peak, there were more than 900 stores in 29 states. Starting out during the Great Depression in rural areas and eventually moving into cities, TG&Y stores were firmly embedded in southern culture as modern-day general stores with a bit of everything. The chain used the advertising slogan, "Your best buy is at TG&Y." The founders articulated their business philosophy as "...have what people want at a price they can afford to pay,"

History
Founded in 1935, the chain was headquartered in Oklahoma City and named for the last initials of its three founders: Rawdon E. Tomlinson, Enoch L. "Les" Gosselin, and Raymond A. Young. The three men each owned separate variety stores in Oklahoma when they met at a trade show in 1932.  In 1935, the three pooled their financial resources to form the Central Merchandising Corporation and built a warehouse in Oklahoma City, allowing their stores to buy merchandise in bulk directly from manufacturers, instead of through wholesalers. They opened their first jointly-owned store in 1936. The owners' initials were ordered according to the ages of the three, with Tomlinson being the oldest. Raymond Young, the only partner remaining with the chain, oversaw operations until his retirement in 1970.

In 1957 TG&Y was acquired by Butler Brothers of Chicago, with the stipulation that Young's leadership remain unchanged. After Young's retirement, leadership changed frequently. By this time, there were 127 retail stores. By 1960, the entire TG&Y operation had become a wholly owned subsidiary of City Products, a Chicago-based company which already operated other variety stores. In 1966, Household Finance Corporation (HFC) acquired City Products.

In 1975, David Green left a supervisor job at TG&Y to open the second location in what would become the Hobby Lobby chain of arts and crafts stores, also based in Oklahoma City.

In 1986, when it had about 920 stores, TG&Y was acquired by competitor McCrory Stores. McCrory was a division of Rapid-American Corporation, a holding company that owned several retail chains. At the time, Rapid-American was solely owned by businessman and money manager Meshulam Riklis.

At its peak, the chain had nearly 1000 stores in 29 states, from Florida to California.

Demise 

After its heyday in the 1960s, unsuccessful attempts were made to expand and rebrand TG&Y under the trade names TG&Y Dollar, Aim for the Best, and Dollar-T. By March 1986, McCrory announced that it would sell about 200 of the 743 TG&Y operations it had so recently acquired.
Shortly after acquiring the struggling chain, McCrory's cut over 8,000 TG&Y employees and closed 205 stores, including 23 in its former home state of Oklahoma.

In addition to the variety stores, which averaged around 15,000 square feet, there was also a larger discount store format of around 30,000 to 40,000 square feet.

Ultimately, over 36,000 TG&Y employees were displaced. Many went to work for Walmart, helping fuel their remarkable growth resulting from TG&Y vacating thriving markets. TG&Y and Walmart had previously avoided locating in the same area, but with TG&Y Stores out of the picture, there was no more such restraint. Others found employment with Hobby Lobby, headed by former TG&Y associate David Green. History shows that Walmart and Hobby Lobby both benefited greatly from this. 

In 2001 TG&Y's owner McCrory Stores filed bankruptcy and all stores were eventually closed. Raymond Young, the youngest and last survivor of the three founders, died in the same year.

Legacy
In January, 2014, the Chisholm Trail Museum of Kingfisher, Oklahoma put on an exhibit commemorating the TG&Y chain, featuring music, merchandise and other displays from its "golden era." The Kingfisher store had opened in 1927. Adam Lynn, museum director, was evidently surprised by the popularity of the exhibit, which had been scheduled to run only through March. He said that over one thousand former employees from as far away as Kansas and Texas had visited this exhibit, which the museum had extended until August of that year. He noted that all the former employees had expressed that they loved working at the store and that they would have continued working there until retirement if the company had not gone out of business. The museum later decided to make the exhibit permanent, and won the "Leadership in History Award of Merit" from the American Association for State and Local History.

A former TG&Y manager, Tom Clinton, decided to open a new version of the old store on January 6, 2003, in Sapulpa, Oklahoma. His opportunity arose when he learned in 2001 that the last TG&Y had closed. He bought the rights to the company name and a former Drug Warehouse building, which provided  of space. The new store's emphasis is on craft items and household goods, but aisles display food products, toys, pet supplies, stationery, yarn, ceramics, tools and hardware, and health and beauty aids.

See also
McCrory Stores
Meshulam Riklis

Notes

References

External links
 TG&Y Images (Google images)

Five and dimes
Defunct discount stores of the United States
Retail companies established in 1935
Retail companies disestablished in 2001
Companies that filed for Chapter 11 bankruptcy in 1992
Companies that have filed for Chapter 7 bankruptcy
McCrory Stores
1935 establishments in Oklahoma
2001 disestablishments in Pennsylvania